Thienopyridines are a class of selective, irreversible ADP receptor/P2Y12 inhibitors used for their anti-platelet activity. They have a significant role in the management of cardiovascular disease.

Clinical Uses 
They are used in the management of peripheral artery disease, as well as the prevention of coronary stent thrombosis and strokes.

Examples
Drugs in this class include:
clopidogrel (Plavix), prasugrel (Effient), and ticlopidine (Ticlid).

Tinoridine was actually a predecessor to this work.

Alternatives
Ticagrelor (Brilinta) is often listed with thienopyridine inhibitors and has similar indications for use but is not a thienopyridine. It is a cyclo-pentyltriazolo-pyrimidine that is distinct from the mechanism of the thienopyridines in that it reversibly (rather than irreversibly) inhibits the P2Y12 receptor.

References